The Ford Fiesta is a supermini car marketed by Ford since 1976 over seven generations. Over the years, the Fiesta has mainly been developed and manufactured by Ford's European operations, and has been positioned below the Escort (later the Focus).

Ford has sold over 22 million Fiestas since 1976, making it one of the best-selling Ford marques behind the Escort and the F-Series. It has been manufactured in the United Kingdom, Germany, Spain, Brazil, Argentina, Venezuela, Mexico, Taiwan, China, India, Thailand, and South Africa.

The Fiesta is planned to be discontinued in June 2023, after 20 million units have been produced; it had been largely displaced by newer models. The hybrid Ford Puma became the more affordable option with the approach of bans on internal-combustion-engined cars.

Development
The Fiesta was originally designed by the project "Bobcat" team headed by Trevor Erskine (not to be confused with the badge-engineered Mercury variant of the Ford Pinto) and approved for development by Henry Ford II in September 1972, just after the launch of two comparable cars – the Fiat 127 and Renault 5. More than a decade earlier, Ford had decided against producing a new small car to rival BMC's Mini, as the production cost was deemed too high, but the 1973 oil crisis caused a rise in the already growing demand for smaller cars.

The Fiesta was an all new car in the supermini segment, and was the smallest car yet made by Ford. Development targets indicated a production cost US$100 less than the current Escort. The car was to have a wheelbase longer than that of the Fiat 127, but with overall length shorter than that of Ford's Escort. The final proposal was developed by Tom Tjaarda at Ghia, overseen by Ford of Europe's then chief stylist Uwe Bahnsen. The project was approved for production in late 1973, with Ford's engineering centres in Cologne and Dunton (Essex) collaborating.

Ford estimated that 500,000 Fiestas a year would be produced, and built a new factory near Valencia, Spain; a transaxle factory near Bordeaux, France; factory extensions for the assembly plants in Dagenham, UK. Final assembly also took place in Valencia.

After years of speculation by the motoring press about Ford's new car, it was subject to a succession of carefully crafted press leaks from the end of 1975. A Fiesta was on display at the Le Mans 24 Hour Race in June 1976, and the car went on sale in France and Germany in September 1976; to the frustration of UK dealerships, right-hand drive versions only began to appear in January 1977. Its initial competitors in Europe, apart from the Fiat 127 and Renault 5, included the Volkswagen Polo and Vauxhall Chevette. Chrysler UK were also about to launch the Sunbeam by this stage, and British Leyland was working on a new supermini, which was launched as the Austin Metro in 1980.

The name "Fiesta" (meaning "party" in Spanish) belonged to General Motors when the car was designed, used as a trim level on Oldsmobile station wagons, and was freely given for Ford to use on their new B-class car. Ford's marketing team had preferred the name "Bravo", but Henry Ford II chose "Fiesta".

First generation (1976)

The Fiesta was initially available in Europe with the Valencia  Straight-four engine (I4) with high- and low-compression options, and  engines and in Base, Popular, Popular Plus, L, GL (1978 onward), Ghia, and S trim levels, as well as a van. The US Mark I Fiesta was built in Cologne, but to slightly different specifications; US models were Base, Decor, Sport, and Ghia, with the Ghia having the highest level of trim. These trim levels changed very little in the Fiesta's three-year run in the US, from 1978 to 1980. All US models featured the more powerful  engine, (which was the older "Crossflow" version of the Kent, rather than the Valencia) fitted with a catalytic converter and air pump to satisfy strict Californian emission regulations), energy-absorbing bumpers, side-marker lamps, round sealed-beam headlamps, and improved crash dynamics and fuel system integrity, as well as optional air conditioning (which was not available in Europe). In the US market, the North American Ford Escort replaced both the Fiesta and the compact Pinto in 1981, competing with the Chevrolet Chevette and Chevrolet Cavalier.

A sporting derivative (1.3 L Supersport) was offered in Europe for the 1980 model year, using the  Kent Crossflow engine, effectively to test the market for the similar XR2 introduced a year later, which featured a 1.6-litre version of the same engine. Black plastic trim was added to the exterior and interior. The small, square headlights were replaced with larger circular ones, with the front indicators being moved into the bumper to accommodate the change.

For the 1979 auto-show season, Ford in conjunction with its Ghia Operations in Turin, Italy,  produced the Ford Fiesta Tuareg off-road car. It was touted in press materials as "a concept vehicle designed and equipped for practical, off-road recreational use."

Minor revisions appeared across the range in late 1981, with larger bumpers to meet crash-worthiness regulations and other small improvements in a bid to maintain showroom appeal ahead of the forthcoming second generation.

Second generation (1983)

The Fiesta Mark II appeared in August 1983 with a revised front end and interior, and a bootlid mirroring the swage lines from the sides of the car. The 1.3 L OHV engine was dropped, being replaced in 1984 by a compound valve-angle hemispherical combustion chamber (CVH) powerplant of similar capacity, itself superseded by the lean burn 1.4 L two years later. The 957 and 1,117 cc Kent/Valencia engines continued with only slight alterations and for the first time a Fiesta diesel was produced with a 1,600 cc engine adapted from the Escort.

The new CTX continuously variable transmission, also fitted in the Fiat Uno, eventually appeared early in 1987 on 1.1 L models only.

The Mk2 Fiesta core range (excluding special editions) was made up of these model variants; Popular, Popular Plus, L, Ghia, 1.4S (1986 onwards), and finally, the XR2.

The second-generation Fiesta featured a different dashboard on the lower-series trim levels compared to the more expensive variants.
The XR2 model was thoroughly updated with a larger body kit. It also featured a  1.6 L CVH engine as previously seen in the Ford Escort XR3, and five-speed gearbox (also standard on the 1.3 L CVH models), rather than the four-speed gearbox, which had been used on the previous XR2 and on the rest of the Fiesta range. The engine was replaced by a lean-burn variant in 1986, which featured a revised cylinder head and carburettor; it was significantly cleaner from an environmental viewpoint, but was slightly less powerful as a result.

A truly "hot" Fiesta was never produced by the factory to avoid impacting sales of performance Ford Escort variants, but many aftermarket conversions were available, the best-known being that by the English firm Turbo Technics boosting power to a well-documented , which easily outclassed its "standard" rivals. Ford appreciated the high quality of this conversion, and was keen to look after its customers; the installation was undertaken by approved fitting centres and all the warranties remained valid after.

The facelifted Fiesta, facing competition from the Austin Metro, Fiat Uno, Nissan Micra, Peugeot 205,  Toyota Starlet, Vauxhall Nova, and Volkswagen Polo, was one of the UK's top superminis. In its best-ever year, 1987, over 150,000 Fiesta models were sold in the UK, though it finished second in the sales charts to the Ford Escort. It was available in Japan, sold at Ford/Mazda dealerships called Autorama; it complied with Japanese government dimension regulations, and the engine displacement was in the more favourable Japanese road tax bracket, which helped sales.

Third generation (BE13; 1989)

The third-generation Fiesta Mark III, codenamed BE-13, was unveiled at the end of 1988 and officially went on sale in February 1989.  The car was based on a new platform, ditching the old car's rear beam axle for a semi-independent torsion beam arrangement, and looked radically different, addressing the principal weakness of the previous generation – the lack of a five-door version, which was by then available in its major rivals such as the Fiat Uno, Peugeot 205 and 106, and Opel Corsa/Vauxhall Nova.  The other main change was to the running gear – the improved high-compression swirl version of the Kent/Valencia powerplant.  The CVH units from the second generation were carried over largely unmodified. The diesel engine was enlarged to a 1.8 L capacity.

The first sports model was the 1.6S CVH 90BHP which had a twin choke Weber carburettor with no CAT and was still on sale until August 1991. It was replaced by the fuel injection XR2i.

This was the first Fiesta to have a fuel-injected engine. This was then replaced by a Zetec 16-valve version in 1992, which also had the RS Turbo being supplanted by the RS1800, as the CVH engine was being phased out. The XR2i name was also dropped in early 1994, and the insurance-friendly "Si" badge appeared in its place on a slightly less sporty-looking model with either the 1.4 L PTE (a development of the CVH) or the 1.6 L Zetec engine.

With the introduction of the successor Mark IV, the Mark III was built and sold at the same time. To distinguish the car, trim levels were revised, and it was marketed as the "Fiesta Classic". This version continued until production finally ceased in 1997.

Fourth generation (BE91; 1995)

The Fiesta Mark IV (internal code name was BE91) was launched in October 1995 and became Britain's best-selling car from 1996 to 1998, when it was overtaken by the all-new Ford Focus, a replacement for the Escort.

The Mark IV benefited from new interior and exterior styling. It maintained similar dimensions to the Mark III, along with the platform and the basic body structure, most noticeably the side door openings. The RS1800 and RS Turbo models were not carried over to the updated Fiesta range.

The model featured a range of new Zetec-SE engines, available in 1.25 L and 1.4 L forms, the 1.8-litre Diesel engine was slightly modified for the Mark IV, now marketed as the "Endura DE". Lower-specification models remained available with what was the final edition of the Kent 1.3 L OHV engine, now known as Endura-E.

As an exercise in badge engineering, the Mazda 121 and Ford Fiesta Mark IV shared their design, were built on the same production lines, and used almost all the same parts. In the JD Power reliability surveys at the time, the Mazda was reported to be significantly more reliable and attracted higher levels of customer satisfaction, despite it being a slower seller than the Fiesta.

Fifth generation (BE256; 2002)

On April 1, 2002, the Fiesta Mark V was unveiled. This generation of the Ford Fiesta (Mk5) is often referred to as Mk6. This is because the previous model, the Mk4 Fiesta, was often called the Mk5 after it received a facelift in 1999. In other words, the 2002-2008 Fiesta is the fifth generation model, and what is often referred to as Mk5 is just a facelift model of the Mk4 – different looking front but still the same car. Production at Almussafes Plant started on April 29, 2002. Most engines were carried over from the previous Fiesta, but renamed "Duratec", as the "Zetec" name was now solely used for sportier models. The previous push-rod 1.3 L engine was initially available in the UK, but this was quickly replaced with a Rocam 1.3 L, both under the name Duratec 8v.

Trim levels available initially were Finesse, LX, Zetec, and Ghia, with limited-edition variants soon following. The fifth generation was also the first Fiesta to feature the antilock braking system and passenger airbags as standard. This generation became the best-selling Ford Fiesta generation to date.

Engines available include 1.25, 1.3, 1.4, 1.6, and 2.0 L petrol engines, plus 1.4 L 8v and 1.6 L 16v Duratorq TDCi common-rail diesels built in a joint venture with PSA. There was also a Supercharged 1.0 L in the Brazilian market.

This was the first Fiesta to be sold in Asia and Australasia (all 1.6 L LX three-door/five-door, Zetec three-door, Ghia five-door), replacing the Kia-based Festiva. In Brazil and Argentina, a Fiesta saloon version was introduced in late 2004. A similar Fiesta saloon model, with a different front end, was released in India in late 2005. This Fiesta generation was ergonomically and mechanically more advanced than any previous generation. The 2005 facelift came with an improved exterior.

Sixth generation (B299/B409; 2008) 

The sixth-generation Fiesta, also known as Mark VI or Mark VII in the UK, was shown in concept form as the Ford Verve at the Frankfurt Motor Show in September 2007, and marketed in principal European markets, Australia and the United States. Developed under the project code B299 and B409, this model uses the new Ford global B-car platform.

The model was launched under the company's new "One Ford" strategy, which called for single models to be manufactured and sold globally to achieve efficiency and economies of scale, instead of making regional models. Production started at Ford's Cologne plant in Germany in August 2008. A second plant in Valencia, Spain, started production in early 2009. Production in China, Thailand, and Mexico started from late 2008 to 2010. In Brazil, the production of the hatchback version started in 2013.

In late September 2012 at the Paris Motor Show, the facelifted Fiesta for the European market went on sale in 2013. It was the first to use Ford's latest corporate front end, which included the newly introduced trapezoidal grille.

Seventh generation (2017)

On November 29, 2016, the seventh-generation Fiesta (Mark VII, or Mark VIII in UK) was announced in Germany. It is said to be larger, roomier, safer, more efficient, and more upmarket compared to its predecessor. The Fiesta range expanded to include new additions - a crossover-styled variant called the Fiesta Active, and the luxury Fiesta Vignale.

Unlike previous generations, the Fiesta has been phased out from North America, South America, Australasia, and Asia, according to Ford, due to the popularity of crossover SUVs, pickup trucks and sports cars, such as the Ranger, Everest, Mustang and Escape. However, the Fiesta ST continued to be sold in Australia due to its popularity and larger profit margin.

Commercial variants
All seven generations of the Fiesta have been available in sedan delivery/panel van format, although not in all markets. The Mark I, II, and III versions feature the standard three-door bodyshell with the rear side glass replaced by body-coloured metal and a flat floor pan instead of the rear seats.

In 1991, a "high-cube"-style van based on the Mark III front bodyshell, but with longer wheelbase and Renault-derived rear torsion bar suspension, was introduced and was named the Ford Courier. The Courier continued in the Mark IV style through  2002, when it was replaced by the Ford Transit Connect.

For the Mark V, the standard Fiestavan version was based on the three-door bodyshell rather than the taller five-door version. The Mark VI Fiesta van was first introduced in the European market in mid-2009, a year after the original launch.

Motorsport

Rallying

Two Ford Fiestas starred in the 1979 Monte Carlo Rally — the British entry driven by Roger Clark and aided by co-driver Jim Porter, and a German entry piloted by Ari Vatanen and co-driven by David Richards. Both cars were highly modified with special motorsport components throughout and featured pioneering limited-slip differential  technology. The cars were powered by competition tuned versions of the 1,600 cc Kent crossflow engine — a later version of which appeared in the Mk 1 Fiesta XR2.  The two rally cars performed well in the arduous ice and snow that year. Roger Clark did not set any records but the German car achieved 9th position overall — a very encouraging result, which sparked demand for sportier Fiestas.

Since this, sporting and "hot hatch" editions have been introduced, including Supersport, XR2, S(Sport), XR2i, Si, RS Turbo, RS1800, Zetec S, Zetec RS, and ST. All of these were powered by a range of engines from the Ford Kent  to the Ford Duratec engines.

The Ford RallyeConcept in 2002  has been realised through an intensely close collaboration between Ford RallyeSport, the motorsport experts behind the Puma Super 1600 and the Focus WRC rally cars, and Ford Design Europe, the creative team responsible for the new three-door Fiesta on which the RallyeConcept is based. Ford RallyeConcept's marriage of the motorsport engineer's objective for performance functionality with the eye for detail of the designer has been so effective that Ford has committed to an engineering development programme to bring a Fiesta-based rally car to reality. Aiming for FIA homologation by mid-2003, Ford RallyeSport is hoping that it will become Ford's next success story in national and international rallying. The Fiesta Super 1600 debuted at Rally Greece 2004.

The "Fiesta Sporting Trophy" is a One Make Championship; beginning its first season in March 2006, it combines keen competition with equal performance and leaves the decision about winning or losing to the drivers and co-drivers' capabilities. The driver, co-driver, and mechanics work as a team to compete against the toughest adversary of all—the clock.

The Fiesta Sporting Trophy is based around the Fiesta ST Group N car. The car has  from the 2 L Duratec ST engine, which when combined with the conversion kit from M-Sport, has been designed to provide all of the safety equipment and performance upgrades to enable the car to be competitive and reliable at any event around the world.

In March 2007, the Pirtek Rally Team introduced the Ford Fiesta Super 2000 rally car, which was to compete in the Australian Rally Championship.

On November 18, 2009, Ford with M-Sport unveiled the Ford Fiesta S2000 Mark VI. Although not due for homologation until January 2010, it was set to make its debut as course car on the final round of the IRC series, Rally Scotland. The car had been built to compete mainly in the Super 2000 World Rally Championship. In 2013, M-Sport developed the Ford Fiesta R5, the successor of the Fiesta S2000; this was based on the 1.6 litre Fiesta ST, and was designed for the Group R5 class of rallying. Fiesta R5 got Evo update in early 2016.
With new WRC regulations coming in 2011, M-Sport developed the Fiesta RS WRC, based on Fiesta S2000. It won six WRC rounds in 2011 and 2012, driven by Jari-Matti Latvala, Mikko Hirvonen and Mads Ostberg, but since M-Sport lost most of its manufacturer support for the 2013 season the car hasn't been able to win. In 2013, Thierry Neuville was the world championship runner-up, being a M-Sport junior works driver. Fiesta RS WRC has been very popular among private drivers, due to its good driveability, reasonable price and good availability.

The WRC regulations will be altered for 2017 and M-Sport has thus started developing the Mk7 Fiesta World Rally Car.

Fiesta ST Group N specifications

Rallycross

The Fiesta Rallycross Supercars version is a racecar with a 2.0 L Duratec turbocharged four-cylinder engine, running on petrol or E85 (85% ethanol/15% petrol). That propels the  rallycross-prepped Fiesta up to sixty in 2.2 seconds. The cars were more powerful (another 200 bhp) than WRC cars.

The Fiesta Mk6 Rallycross cars made their US debuts in the 2009 Pikes Peak International Hill Climb in Colorado. Swedish team Olsbergs MSE announced the cars would later appear in ESPN's X Games 15 on 2009-08-02.

British company M-Sport also builds Fiesta Rallycross Supercars to Global Rallycross Championship teams Hoonigan Racing Division, Chip Ganassi Racing and Bryan Herta Autosport.

Driving a Fiesta, Tanner Foust won the 2011 and 2012 Global RallyCross Championship and was runner-up in the 2011 and 2012 FIA European Rallycross Championship. Toomas Heikkinen won the Global RallyCross Championship in 2013 and Joni Wiman and 2014. Other notable drivers include Marcus Grönholm, Ken Block and Brian Deegan.

An Olsbergs MSE RX Supercar Lite from FIA Rallycross Lite is also based on Ford FIesta.

Circuit racing
In the UK, the Fiesta is commonly used in club level motorsport series but has its national one-make series called the Ford Fiesta Championship. During its peak in the 1980s and 1990s, it had manufacturer support and it even was a support race to the British Grand Prix and numerous British Touring Car Championship rounds. The series has gone through numerous name changes including Ford Credit Fiesta Championship, Ford Fiesta Zetec Championship and BRSCC Ford Si Challenge and is nowadays run by the BRSCC (British Racing and Sports Car Club) as a club racing championship. The organisation also run the other series that consists of Fiestas.
 Ford XR Challenge, for XR2 and XR2i models, also consists of the Escort XR models.
 Ford Saloon Championship, mainly for a wider range of Ford models but Fiestas are mostly seen in classes C and E with a Mk 4 example winning the title outright in 2006 at the hands of Ollie Allen.
The car has also been raced in the Touring-Light division of the Russian Touring Car Championship.

Fiesta drivers won the Super 1600 class of the European Touring Car Cup seven times from 2008 to 2016.

Sales and popularity
The Fiesta has been Britain's most popular new car in 1990, 1991, 1996, 1997, 1998 and each year from 2009 to 2020,  by the time of the MK2 Fiesta's demise in early 1989, just under 1,300,000 had been sold in Britain since its launch 12 years earlier, In June 2014 Ford claimed the largest market share in the UK, of 12.87% – and almost half of those registrations belonged to the Fiesta. By July 2014, the Fiesta became the UK's best-selling car of all time, with 4,115,000 sold, and its shown in The following table.

Awards and recognition

The 2011 Fiesta was one of the five finalists for the 2011 Green Car of the Year awarded by the Green Car Journal in November 2010, competing with two plug-in electric vehicles, the Nissan Leaf and the Chevrolet Volt (the winner), and two hybrid electric vehicles.

 Winner of UK Design Council Efficiency Award for "exemplary contribution to the reduction of running and maintenance costs" in 1978. The award was presented by Prince Philip.
 Winner Australia's Best Small Car in 2004.
 Winner of Business Standard Motoring Jury Award, 2006.
 What Car's Best Used Supermini for 2006 – 1.4 Zetec 3dr 2003 – Runner Up Toyota Yaris 1.0 T2 3dr 2003.
 Winner of Brazilian Auto Esporte magazine Car of the Year in 2005 (Fiesta Sedan).
 Winner of Game Informer magazine Best Racing Games of the Year For Best Car in 2011 (Fiesta Gymkhana Car).
 Named Scottish Car of the Year 2008 at the 11th annual Association of Scottish Motoring Writers (ASMW) awards dinner in St Andrew's, Scotland.
 Named 'Car of the Year 1989' by Britain's What Car? magazine.
 Named 'Car of the Year 2009' by Britain's What Car? magazine.
 Named 'Semperit Irish Small car of the Year' by tyre manufacturer Semperit
 Named 'Car of the Year' and 'Best Supermini' in Auto Express magazine's New Car Awards 2009.
 Fiesta ECOnetic named 'Least boring green car' of 2009 by Top Gear's James May.
 First minicar to achieve Top Safety Pick by the US Insurance Institute for Highway Safety (IIHS) based on front-, side- and rear-impact crash testing and roof-strength.
 Winner of the 2011 AJAC Car of the year award for Best Small Car under $21,000.
 Named 'Supermini of the Year 2013' by Britain's What Car?
 Named 'Used Car of the Year 2012' by UK's CAP Black Book Car Guide.
 Fiesta ST chosen Top Gear's Car of the Year 2013
 Best Driver's Car Award – Bloomberg-UTV Autocar India Awards
 Business Standard Motoring Jury Award 2006
 Fiesta ST awarded Winner 'Best Performance Car Under $100k ' in 2015 by Carsales during their Car Of The Year in Australia.
Fiesta ST awarded Top Gear (TG) Magazine's car of the year 2019 – 
Fiesta ST named Parker's car of the year 2019
Fiesta named as 'Car Buyer car of the year 2019' and Fiesta ST named as 'Car Buyer hot hatch of the year 2019'

Discontinuation 
In October 2022 Ford executives announced that the Fiesta is set to be discontinued by mid-2023, as costs of parts increase and drivers opt for SUVs. This will also allow the company to focus on electrifying its lineup.

See also
 Ford Ikon

References

External links

  (Germany)
  (UK)
 Official Brochures (US): 2011, 2012, 2013, 2014, 2015, 2016 

 
Cars introduced in 1976
Subcompact cars
Sedans
Euro NCAP superminis
Latin NCAP superminis
Hot hatches
Ford B3 platform
Rally cars
Touring cars
Cars of Spain
Vehicles with CVT transmission
Front-wheel-drive vehicles
Goods manufactured in Germany
1970s cars
1980s cars
1990s cars
2000s cars
2010s cars
2020s cars
Rallycross cars

zh:福特嘉年華